Farrar is an outer eastern suburb of Palmerston. It is 21 km SE of the Darwin CBD. Its Local Government Area is the City of Palmerston. Farrar is bounded to the north and east by the Stuart Highway, to the west Roystonea Avenue. Farrar was originally part of Gunn when Palmerston was divided into suburbs in 1984.

The development of Palmerston's eastern suburbs did not start in the 1990s as designed in 1984 and the suburb of Gunn of 1998 was larger. It was decided in 1999 to allocate a new name to the area of Gunn between the old and new Stuart Highway alignments.

The suburb is named after John Farrar, a pastoral pioneer of the Northern Territory.

References

External links
https://web.archive.org/web/20080123190745/http://www.nt.gov.au/lands/lis/placenames/origins/greaterdarwin.shtml#f

Suburbs of Darwin, Northern Territory